Alexander Tikhonov (born 1947) is a Russian biathlete.

Alexander Tikhonov may also refer to:

 Oleksandr Tikhonov (1938–2019), Ukrainian pharmacist
 Alexandre Tichonov (born 1962), Russian rugby union player
 Aleksandr Tikhonov (footballer) (born 1963), Russian footballer
 Alexander Tikhonov (swimmer) (born 1988), Russian swimmer
 Alexander Tikhonov (publisher) (1880–1956), Russian writer and publisher